East Runton is a small village in Norfolk, England situated close to the North Sea. It was once a traditional fishing village outside Cromer but is now a popular holiday destination for camping and caravan holidays. The village is within the parish of Runton that also includes West Runton. The village lies on the A149 coast road but most of the dwellings can be found just south of the road, nestled around the two village greens. The population in the 2001 census was shown as 1,633 (includes West Runton) in 784 households. At the 2011 census the population was included in the civil parish of Runton. The parish area is 544 hectares.

The war dead of East Runton are recorded on the West Runton War Memorial.

The villages name means either, Runa's farm/settlement' or 'Runi's farm/settlement'.

Public houses
There are two public houses in East Runton: the Fishing Boat and the White Horse Inn. The Fishing Boat is the older of the inns, and is on the tithe map of 1840, although it was simply called the ‘Boat Inn’ then. In 1734 it is recorded that a court was held at the inn and it was then called the ‘Three Horse Shoes’. The White Horse Inn is first recorded in 1851. There is also a social club in the village which is known as ‘Bernies’ Corner House in Beach Road which in years prior was an amusement arcade but this changed to current usage in around 1982.  Bernie's was named after Bernie Parkin whose father Reginald (Snr) originally had bought the place and had run it as an amusement arcade.
Next door is a fish and chip shop. This was run for some time (especially during the 1980s) by John Parkin (Bernie's brother).

The Windmill
The tower mill at East Runton dates from at least 1826 when it is shown on Bryants map. The mill has now been restored and is a private dwelling. The mill was last worked in 1908 and has a cap that resembles an upturned clinker-built boat. This style of top is known as the Norfolk style. The restored tower now is complete with its cap, gallery and fantail but to date has no sails. The tower had five storeys and once had three pairs of stones which were powered from the four double-shuttered sails. The village once also had a wooden post mill although there is no trace of where this was located other than a piece of land close to the railway which to this day is called Mill Hill and is now a caravan storage facility.

Story of James Leak
James Leak was a resident of East Runton around the early part of the 19th century. Leak was the local blacksmith and renowned Bare-Knuckle prize fighter. He lived in one of six thatched cottages that once stood on the cliff top near Runton gap. His blacksmith's forge was at East Runton. In 1827 Leak had a big problem. The story goes that he had developed a gangrenous toe and was in fear of it spreading and causing his death. In his desperation, Leak came up with his own solution to his problem. He went to his forge in East Runton, rested his foot on his anvil and with one mighty blow removed the infected toe with a hammer and chisel. He then cauterized the stump with a red hot poker from out of his forge. This desperate surgery had been as a consequence of Leak being unable to afford surgeon's fees. He made a full recovery and his home surgery seems to have had little effect on the man as he continued his prize-fighting and lived to the age of 82.

Surfing

The beach at East Runton is popular with the surfing fraternity. Located on a cliff-top, the Surfers' Memorial was unveiled in 2003. The weather vane is topped with a figure depicting a surfer.

See also
West Runton
West Runton elephant
East Runton Tower Windmill

Gallery

References

External links 

 
Villages in Norfolk
North Norfolk
Populated coastal places in Norfolk